TerraTec Electronic GmbH is a German manufacturer of sound cards, computer speakers, webcams, computer mice, video grabbers and TV tuner cards. TerraTec is mainly known for its sound cards, and is the largest German producer of them.

The company was founded by Walter Grieger and Heiko Meertz in 1994 in Nettetal, Germany. Both Grieger and Meerts are still CEOs of the company.

There was a time when Terratec mainly produced graphic cards. But it dropped the production later and focused on sound cards.
Furthermore, TerraTec is distributing hardware and software products like professionally studio software Cubase for musicians or hardware like PhonoPreAmpiVinyl to digitalizing recordings from vinyl or tapes to digital audio formats.

TerraTec also produces the "Axon" brand of Pitch-to-MIDI or guitar synthesizer converters. AXON's current models include the AX100 and the AX50USB.

Products

Sound cards
Terratec Aureon 7.1
Terratec Aureon 7.1 Universe
Terratec DMX 6Fire
Terratec Promedia SoundSystem DMX

See also 
 Cubase

References

External links 

Manufacturing companies established in 1994
Computer hardware companies of Germany
Audio equipment manufacturers of Germany
Computer peripheral companies
German brands
Companies based in North Rhine-Westphalia